Twilight Zone: 19 Original Stories on the 50th Anniversary is an anthology of short stories written by various authors and edited by Carol Serling, the widow of series creator Rod Serling. Each story was written with themes or styles similar to The Twilight Zone episodes, including a narrated introduction and conclusion. Authors who contributed stories include Twilight Zone veterans Earl Hamner Jr., Alan Brennert, William F. Wu, and Rod Serling. Reviewers listed some of the better stories as being Kelley Armstrong's "A Haunted House of Her Own", Alan Brennert's "Puowaina" and Mike Resnick and Lezli Robyn's  "Benchwarmer".

Background
This anthology of short stories was published to mark the fiftieth anniversary of the television debut of The Twilight Zone. Since the death of her husband, The Twilight Zone creator Rod Serling, Carol Serling had been acting as a consultant for a series of fiction anthologies and for the 1983 theatrical film. She contributed to or edited books including Journeys to the Twilight Zone, Adventures in the Twilight Zone, Return to the Twilight Zone, More Stories from the Twilight Zone, and the non-fiction book Rod Serling and The Twilight Zone: The 50th Anniversary Tribute. Among the authors solicited to write stories for the 50th anniversary book were Alan Brennert and William F. Wu, who worked on the 1980s The Twilight Zone series; Earl Hamner Jr., who wrote episodes for the original series; and Rod Serling's older brother, Robert J. Serling. Peter S. Beagle and Harlan Ellison were advertised as contributors but their stories did not make it into the book.

Synopsis and format
The book begins with an introduction by the editor Carol Serling and ends with brief biographies of all the authors. Each of the 19 self-contained short stories includes an introduction and conclusion with the same tone and style as Rod Serling's narration at the beginning and end of each Twilight Zone episode.

Adam Balm on Ain't It Cool News categorized the short stories into the following four basic types of The Twilight Zone episode formats: the social revenge fantasies ("The Art of Miniature", "Family Man", and "The Good Neighbor") use unlikable characters who eventually suffer an ironic twist to their predicament; stories about paranoid characters trying to convince others that something is wrong ("The Street that Forgot Time"); stories with a war theme ("Genesis", "Puowaina", "Ghost Writer", and "The Soldier He Needed to Be"); and stories centered on a hitch-hiker ("On the Road" and "Truth or Consequences").

Segments

Publication and reception
The book was published by Tor Books as a hardcover and paperback in September 2009. To help with its promotion a 39-second video trailer was produced. Compared to Rod Serling and The Twilight Zone: The 50th Anniversary Tribute, which was reviewed by writer Elizabeth Hand as "a piece of hagiography that does little to illuminate Serling's genius or the enduring appeal of his most famous creation", the anthology was called "a far superior homage to Serling". In her Magazine of Fantasy and Science Fiction column Hand listed Hagberg's "Genesis" are the best story in the anthology though Lansdale and Stine's are also good. She called Rod Serling and Strieber's stories "the only real misfires".

The review in Publishers Weekly listed Armstrong's "A Haunted House of Her Own", Brennert's "Puowaina", and Tad Williams's "Ants" as the best stories. The review also listed Wu's "On the Road", Douglas's "Truth or Consequences", and Robert Serling's "Ghost Writer" as being "less satisfying" stories. The review concluded that the book is "largely inoffensive and faithful to the Twilight Zone format, this anthology is primarily of interest to hardcore fans". Carl Hays from Booklist wrote a positive review, saying "superior craftsmanship ensures can't-miss entertainment for speculative-fiction fans and anyone nostalgic for the original Twilight Zone aura". Impressed by the authors, the reviewer in the Library Journal wrote "with this slate of authors and the perennial popularity of the show, all libraries should own a copy".

The Starlog reviewer, David McDonnell, lists the anthology's best stories as Lansdale's "Torn Away", Zahn's "Vampin' Down the Avenue", Resnick and Robyn's "Benchwarmer", and Armstrong's "A Haunted House of Her Own". McDonnell noted that Rod Serling's "El Moe" was least like a typical Twilight Zone story, and that Williams's "Ants" belonged to the Alfred Hitchcock Presents universe rather than The Twilight Zone. On Ain't It Cool News, Adam Balm identified  Wu's "On the Road" as "the best entry in the collection". Balm wrote that the anthology is  "uneven, with too many stories disappointing and too many that are nostalgianautic remember-whens, mining territory long since tamed and settled by others" but ultimately worth the money spent.

References 

2009 anthologies
The Twilight Zone
Fiction set in 1863
Fiction set in 1918
Fiction set in the 1920s
Fiction set in 1945
Fiction set in 1965
Fiction set in 1970
Fiction set in 2009
Science fiction anthologies
Ghosts in popular culture
American Civil War fiction
World War II fiction
Short fiction about time travel